"I'll Stop Loving You" is a song co-written and recorded by American country music artist Mike Reid.  It was released in November 1991 as the fourth single from the album Turning for Home.  The song reached number 23 on the Billboard Hot Country Singles & Tracks chart.  The song was written by Reid and Robert Byrne.

Chart performance

References

1992 singles
Mike Reid (singer) songs
Songs written by Robert Byrne (songwriter)
Songs written by Mike Reid (singer)
Song recordings produced by Steve Buckingham (record producer)
Columbia Nashville Records singles
1991 songs